Kalanaur may refer to:

 Kalanaur, Punjab, a town in the Indian state of Punjab
 Kalanaur, Haryana, a town in the Indian state of Haryana